Robert Grieshaber (23 April 1846, in Hallau – 25 October 1928) was a Swiss politician and President of the Swiss National Council (1897/1898).

External links 
 
 

1846 births
1928 deaths
People from the canton of Schaffhausen
Swiss Calvinist and Reformed Christians
Free Democratic Party of Switzerland politicians
Members of the National Council (Switzerland)
Presidents of the National Council (Switzerland)